Hugh Shaw may refer to:

 Hugh Shaw (VC)  (1839–1904), recipient of the Victoria Cross
 Hugh Shaw (football manager) (1896–1976), Scottish football player and manager (Hibernian)
 Hugh Shaw (footballer, born 1929), Scottish football player (Tranmere Rovers)
 Hugh Murray Shaw (1876–1934), farmer, rancher and Canadian federal politician